Harrow Weald Common is an 18-hectare area of woodland, heath and pasture in Harrow Weald in the London Borough of Harrow. It is considered of considerable importance for wildlife, and it was formerly part of the Stanmore and Harrow Weald Commons and Bentley Priory Site of Special Scientific Interest, but in 1987 the boundaries of the SSSI were revised to exclude the Common. It has been designated by the Mayor of London as a Site of Metropolitan Importance for Nature Conservation.

History
The word weald is derived from Old English wald, a wooded upland. Harrow Weald Common is one of the remnants of the once extensive Forest of Middlesex. In the eighteenth century it was a haunt of highwaymen. Following the Enclosure Acts, one of the rights granted to the commoners was gravel extraction, and this took place on a large scale in the nineteenth century. In the 1880s there was an attempt to get government agreement to the sale of the Common, but a successful campaign to oppose this was supported by W. S. Gilbert, who lived locally at a house called Grim's Dyke. In 1899 the Metropolitan Commons (Harrow Weald) Supplemental Act revoked most of the rights of the commoners and a board of Conservators was set up to manage the Common.  

Harrow Weald Common is Common Land not owned by anyone, and in 1965 it was placed under the protection of Harrow Council. The Harrow Weald Common Conservators are now a Friends Group which manage the site.

The site
The site includes Grims' Dyke Open Space. Grim's Dyke or Grim's Ditch is an ancient earthwork which runs for three miles between Harrow Weald Common and Pinner Green. Its purpose is unknown, and it may date from the fifth or sixth centuries. Adjacent to the site are the City Open Space, Harrow Weald SSSI, a geological Site of Special Scientific Interest, and Bentley Priory Nature Reserve, a biological SSSI.

There is access from Common Road and Old Redding.

See also
 Harrow parks and open spaces

References

External links
VisitWoods, Harrow Weald Common and Weald Wood, a London Borough of Harrow wood 
 BBC, Domesday Reloaded, Harrow Weald Common
 Harrow Council, Harrow Weald Common
 London Gardens Online, Harrow Weald Common, Grim's Dyke Open Space, The City Open Space

 

Nature reserves in the London Borough of Harrow
Parks and open spaces in the London Borough of Harrow
Common land in London